The following is a list of notable people associated with Trinity University, located in the American city of San Antonio, Texas.

Arts and entertainment 

 Chingo Bling, born Pedro Herrera III (B.S., business administration marketing, 2001) – rapper and record executive
 Deanna Dunagan (M.A., drama) - Actress who won the 2008 Tony Award for Best Actress in a Play
 Brunson Green (B.S., economics, 1991) – Academy Award-nominated producer of The Help
 Gibby Haynes (B.S., business administration, 1981) – lead singer of the Butthole Surfers, a rock band formed at Trinity
 David N. Johnson (B.Mus., music, 1950) – composer, organist, and professor
 Paul Leary (B.A., art, 1980) – member of the Butthole Surfers
 Robert McCollum – voice actor affiliated with Funimation
 Donald Moffett (B.A., art, 1977) – painter
Peter Mui (B.A.) – fashion designer and entrepreneur
Emilio Nicolás Sr (M.A., 1952) – founder of Univision
 Naomi Shihab Nye (B.A., English, 1974) – poet, songwriter and novelist
 Jaclyn Smith – actress and model
 Bob West (B.A., art, 1978) – voice of Barney, the purple dinosaur seen on PBS children's programming
 Josh Wolf (B.A., communication, 1993) – comedian, actor, writer

Athletics 
Kyle Altman (born 1986) - soccer player
Pete Cole – football player NFL New York Giants 1937- 1940 (Guard) NFL Champions 1938, Pro Bowl 1938
 Frank Conner (B.S., business administration, 1970) – professional golfer, PGA and Champions Tour; tennis player
 Brian Gottfried (1972) – professional tennis player (# 3 in the world) and coach
 Jerry Grote (1962), former Major League Baseball player - 1963 to 1981 Catcher (Colt 45's, Mets, Dodgers, Royals), 2x All Star, 1x World Series Champion.
Irv Hill (1908-1978), American football running back in the National Football League for the Chicago Cardinals and Boston Redskins
Darrell Hogan (B.S., physical education, 1949) – former NFL defensive lineman, Pittsburgh Steelers (1949–1953)
Erick Iskersky (B.A., physical education, 1980) - former Professional Tennis Player and three time All American (1977-1979)
 Davey Johnson (B.A., mathematics, 1964) – former Major League Baseball player and manager -  As a player (2nd baseman) 1965 to 1978 (Orioles, Braves, Phillies, Cubs), 3x Golden Glove winner, 4x All-Star, 2x World Series Champion. As a Manager (Mets, Reds, Orioles, Dodgers, Nationals)- 1x World Series Champion, 2x Manager of the Year.
 Lance Key (B.A., philosophy, 2000) – three-time All-American soccer player; former player for the Colorado Rapids in Major League Soccer; former Trinity women's soccer coach, current Hardin-Simmons women's soccer coach
 Obert Logan (B.A., mathematics, 1965), – NFL safety, Dallas Cowboys (1965–66), New Orleans Saints (1967)
 Gretchen Magers (B.S., physical education, 1986) – former professional tennis player who reached a career-high singles ranking of World No. 22 in the late 1980s and was runner-up in the 1988 mixed doubles at Wimbledon, current women's tennis coach at Trinity
 Chuck McKinley (B.S., mathematics, 1964) – tennis player at Trinity, later professional player and 1963 Wimbledon singles champion
 Bob Polk, Head Coach, Men's Basketball – led Tigers to 1968 NCAA Tourney
 Henry Schmidt (1958) – former NFL defensive lineman, San Francisco 49ers and San Diego Chargers (1959–1966)
 Anne Smith (B.A., psychology, 1993) – professional tennis player, numerous tennis Grand Slam doubles titles
 Dick Stockton (B.A., sociology, 1972) – professional tennis player, ranked as high as No. 8 tennis player in the 70s
 Marvin Upshaw (B.S., physical education, 1970) – former NFL defensive lineman, Cleveland Browns (1968–1969), Kansas City Chiefs (1970–1975), St. Louis Cardinals (1976)
 Jerheme Urban (B.A., social studies, 2003) – NFL wide receiver, Seattle Seahawks (2003–2006), Dallas Cowboys (2006–2007), Arizona Cardinals (2007–2009), Kansas City Chiefs (2010–2011); first Trinity alumnus to appear in a Super Bowl, current head football coach at Trinity
 Jeremy Wolf (B.A., communications, 2016) - American-Israeli baseball player on the Israel National Baseball Team

Business 

 Sardar Biglari (B.S., finance, 1999)  –  Chairman and CEO of Biglari Holdings; Manager of the Lion Fund
 Daniel Lubetzky (B.A., international studies and economics, 1990) – CEO of KIND Healthy Snacks; founder of the PeaceWorks Foundation
 John Mackey (businessman) - co-founder and CEO of Whole Foods Market
 Gavin Maloof (B.A., speech and communications, 1979) – co-owner of the Sacramento Kings
 David Prager (B.A., media studies and communications, 1979) – co-founder and vice-president of Revision3
 Alice Walton (B.S., business administration, 1971) – Forbes 400; daughter of Walmart founder Sam Walton
 Richard Yoo – co-founder and former CEO of Rackspace and ServerBeach

Education 
 John Silber (B.A., philosophy, 1947) – Chancellor and former president of Boston University; candidate for governor of Massachusetts in 1990
 Margaret A. Edwards – Educator, librarian, and activist for the movement for young adult services, namesake for Margaret Edwards Award
 Herbert H. Reynolds (1952) - President of Baylor University, 1981-1995
Belle Wheelan - Former Virginia Secretary of Education  and President and CEO of Southern Association of Colleges and Schools‘ Commission on Colleges
 Jay Hartzell (B.S., economics, 1991) - President of the University of Texas at Austin, 2020-present

Government and military 

 William C. Chase (M.A., History) – Major General, US Army
 Russell Budd (B.A.) – American trial lawyer, Democratic Party fund-raiser
 John Cornyn (B.A., print journalism, 1973) – United States Senator from Texas
 James T. Hill (B.A., political science, 1968) – General, U.S. Army & former commander, U.S. Southern Command
Robert Holleyman (B.A., political science) - President and CEO of Business Software Alliance, former Deputy US Trade Ambassador at Office of the United States Trade Representative
 Joe M. Kilgore – former U.S. representative from Texas, attended Trinity in the mid-1930s
 Gregory Luna (B.A., Math) - Former Democratic member of the Texas House of Representatives and the Texas Senate
 Mac McCutcheon (B.A., Criminal Justice Administration) - Speaker and Member of the Alabama House of Representatives 
 Michael McCaul (B.A., business administration and history, 1984) – Representative for Texas U.S. House District 10
 Matt Mead (B.A, radio and television, 1984) – Governor of the state of Wyoming
 Dan Morales (B.A, political science, 1978) – former Attorney General of Texas
 Lisette M. Mondello – former Assistant Secretary of Public and Intergovernmental Affairs in the United States Department of Veterans Affairs
 Ron Nirenberg (B.A, communications, 1999) – Mayor of San Antonio, Texas
 Brad Parscale (B.S, international business, finance, macroeconomics, 1999) – Campaign manager for Donald Trump presidential campaign, 2020
 William K. Suter (B.A., sociology 1959) – clerk of the United States Supreme Court; former Major General in the United States Army
 Henry T. Waskow (B.A., history, 1939) – US Army officer in World War II
 Oscar K. Allen – 42nd Governor of Louisiana, 1932–1936
 Suleiman Jasir Al-Herbish (M.A., economics) – Director of the OPEC Fund for International Development, 2003-2018
Erik Walsh (B.A., political science, 1991; M.S., Urban Administration, 1994) — City Manager of San Antonio, TX

Other 

John Hagee (B.S., History, 1964) – Evangelical Christian leader and author
Mike Opelka - radio broadcaster and television producer
Uma Pemmaraju (B.A., political science, 1980) – Fox News journalist
Michael Joseph Boulette (M.A., psychology) - Auxiliary bishop of the Archdiocese of San Antonio
William Rick Singer - CEO of Key International Freedom, mastermind of 2019 college admissions bribery scandal
Robert S. (Bobby) Wolff : American Bridge player , won a total of eleven World championships, only player to win world championship in all formats of the game, won more than thirty North American championships and served as president of World Bridge Federation and President of American contract bridge league (ACBL)

Notable faculty 
William L. Breit (Economics) – E.M. Stevens Distinguished Professor of Economics, mystery novelist, comedian
Rachel Caroline Eaton – Dean of Women
David W. Lesch (History) – Professor of Middle East History
Norman Sherry (English) – Mitchell Professor of Literature
Andrew Porter (English) - Professor

References

External links
 

Trinity University people
Trinity University people